Colobodactylus taunayi, also known commonly as the Taunay teiid or Taunay's teiid, is a species of lizard in the family Gymnophthalmidae. The species is endemic to Brazil.

Etymology
The specific name, taunayi, is in honor of Brazilian historian Afonso d'Escragnolle Taunay.

Geographic range
C. taunayi occurs in the Brazilian state of São Paulo.

Habitat
The preferred natural habitat of C. taunayi is forest.

Reproduction
C. taunayi is oviparous.

References

Further reading
Amaral A (1933). "Estudos sobre Lacertilios neotropicos. I. Novos generos e especies de lagartos do Brasil ". Memorias do Instituto Butantan 7: 51–75. (Colobodactylus taunayi, new species, pp. 70–71). (in Portuguese).

Colobodactylus
Reptiles of Brazil
Endemic fauna of Brazil
Reptiles described in 1933
Taxa named by Afrânio Pompílio Gastos do Amaral